Statistics of Czechoslovak First League in the 1968–69 season.

Overview
It was contested by 14 teams, and Spartak Trnava won the championship. Ladislav Petráš was the league's top scorer with 20 goals.

Stadia and locations

League standings

Results

Top goalscorers

References

Czechoslovakia - List of final tables (RSSSF)

Czechoslovak First League seasons
Czech
1968–69 in Czechoslovak football